Varvarovka is a rural locality (a khutor) in Lipchanskoye Rural Settlement, Bogucharsky District, Voronezh Oblast, Russia. The population was 519 as of 2010. There are 4 streets.

Geography 
Varvarovka is located 27 km southwest of Boguchar (the district's administrative centre) by road. Shurinovka is the nearest rural locality.

References 

Rural localities in Bogucharsky District